Las amazonas, is a Mexican telenovela produced by Salvador Mejía Alejandre for Televisa. It is an original story based on some arguments of the Venezuelan telenovela of 1985, Las Amazonas created by César Miguel Rondón. The series originally aired from May 16 to August 7, 2016.

The series is starring Victoria Ruffo as Inés, Danna García as Diana, César Évora as Victoriano, Grettell Valdez as Casandra, René Casados as Eduardo, Natalia Guerrero as Lisete, Mariluz Bermúdez as Constanza, Guillermo García Cantú as Loreto and Andrés Palacios as Alejandro.

Plot 
Tells the story of Victoriano, a landowner and businessman, father of three daughters (Diana, Casandra and Constanza), victims of lies and heartaches which prevents, him from being with the love of his life. She has also sacrificed her happiness, as she becomes the victim of an act of violence condemning her to live the shadows the Santos family.

The daughters of Victoriano each struggle in their own way, to find their respective happiness falling in love with three different types of men, not liked by their. This brings conflict into the Santos family.  Diana, the eldest daughter is the one who comes to resemble her father.  Casandra is sensible and independent, determined to make her way alone; Constanza is the younger, rebellious daughter who is eager to live her life to the fullest.  The rest of the characters are composed of friends and foes of the Santos family, one of whom harbors a secret and resentment and when it is revealed, it will shake the entire family to the core.  This is the second attempt by Televisa in producing this series.  The 2003 version began production strangely enough without originally being called "Las Amazonas".  Midway through production, executives decided to change the title. This created all sorts of confusion as not even the actors back new the name of the product. Matters were not helped as the script called for the character of Victoriano to affectionately call his daughters Amazons, due to their ability to ride thoroughbred horses in the ranch.  The soap opera finally come up with a name:  "Niña Amada Mía" ("My beloved girl") as the production wanted to vertically integrate popular songs making he public identify the song with their drama.  The theme song was sung by Mexican superstar Alejandro Fernandez.

Cast

Main 

 Victoria Ruffo as Inés Huerta de Santos
 Danna García as Diana Santos Luna
 César Évora as Victoriano Santos
 Grettell Valdez as Casandra Santos Luna
 René Casados as Eduardo Mendoza Castro
 Natalia Guerrero as Lisete Ruiz
 Mariluz Bermúdez as Constanza Santos Luna
 Guillermo García Cantú as Loreto Guzmán Váldez
 Andrés Palacios as Alejandro San Román

Recurring 

 Jacqueline Andere as Bernarda Castro vda. de Mendoza  
 Liz Gallardo as Monserrat
 Gabriela Vergara as Déborah Piñeiro de Santos/Eugenia Villarroel
 Juan Pablo Gil as Emiliano Guzmán Huerta
 Eduardo Liñán as Genaro Villa 
 Alejandro Ruiz as Alonso
 Alex Sirvent as Fabrizio Allende
 Héctor Cruz as Ing Bermúdez
 Boris Duflos as Robby Arrieta Mejía
 Fernando Robles as Artemio
 Marcia Coutiño as Delia 
 Alejandro Estrada as Elías Villaroel
 Rafael del Villar as Roberto
 Benjamín Rivero as Melitón Meléndez
 Marielena Zamora as Jacinta Ruiz
 Palmeira Cruz as Candela
 Rosita Pelayo as Lucha
 Marco Montero
 Flora Fernández as Amicela
 Carla Stefan as Elvia
 Miranda Kay as María José San Román Ruiz
 Sarahí Meza as Belen
 Valentina de los Cobos as Sabina San Román Ruiz
 Landon Jay as Iván Villarroel

Special guest 
 Alfredo Adame as Vicente Mendoza Castro
 Mónica Ayos as Diana Maria Luna de Santos / Diana Elisa

Awards and nominations

References

External links 
 

2016 telenovelas
Mexican telenovelas
Televisa telenovelas
2016 Mexican television series debuts
2016 Mexican television series endings
Mexican television series based on Venezuelan television series
Spanish-language telenovelas